Jeannette Batti (1921–2011) was a French film actress.

Partial filmography

 Shop Girls of Paris (1943) - Une vendeuse (uncredited)
 Le Roi des resquilleurs (1945) - Lulu
 Back Streets of Paris (1946) - Mona
 Une nuit à Tabarin (1947) - Jeannette
 Mademoiselle Has Fun (1948) - Fifi
 Eternal Conflict (1948) - Janette
 To the Eyes of Memory (1948) - Ketty
 Jean de la Lune (1949) - Mlle Rolande
 The Chocolate Girl (1949) - Rosette
 Amédée (1950) - Jacqueline
 Voyage à trois (1950) - Huguette
 Moumou (1951) - Claudine
 Paris Is Always Paris (1951) - Claudia
 Nous irons à Monte-Carlo (1951) - Marinette
 Henriette (1952) - Gisèle
 A Hundred Francs a Second (1953) - Louloute
 L'étrange amazone (1953) - Olga
 Une nuit à Megève (1953) - Georgette
 Les détectives du dimanche (1953) - Isabelle
 L'oeil en coulisses (1953) - Martine Cairolle
 Soirs de Paris (1954) - Roxy
 J'y suis... j'y reste (1954) - Lucie
 Trois de la Canebière (1956) - Margot
 Coup dur chez les mous (1956) - Gigi
 Les carottes sont cuites (1956)
 La Traversée de Paris (1956) - Mariette Martin
 L'auberge en folie (1957) - Gloria Royal
 Three Sailors (1957) - Angèle
 The Pirates of the Mississippi (1963) - Mrs. Bridleford
 Queste pazze pazze donne (1964) - Marisa - the Commendatore's wife ('La garçonnière') (uncredited)
 Jealous as a Tiger (1964) - Dame Toilette
 Les gros malins (1969) - La comtesse
 Le clair de terre (1970)
 Les joyeux lurons (1972) - La patronne de boîte
 Sacrés gendarmes (1980) - L'épiciére
 La nuit de la mort! (1980) - Marie-Madeleine
 Touch' pas à mon biniou (1980) - La femme d'Henri
 Santa Claus Is a Stinker (1982)

References

External links

1921 births
2011 deaths
Actresses from Marseille
French film actresses
20th-century French actresses